Percolatea are a class of excavates in the phylum Percolozoa.

See also
 Percolozoa

References

Percolozoa
Excavata classes